Iredalea pupoidea is a species of sea snail, a marine gastropod mollusk in the family Drilliidae.

According to Gastropods.com, this species is a synonym of Haedropleura pygmaea (Dunker, R.W., 1860)

Description
The length of the shell attains 7 mm, its diameter 3 mm.

The elongate-ovoid, solid shell has numerous, longitudinal, obtuse ribs. The sutures on the convex-conical spire are impressed. The shell contains 6 whorls. The anal sinus is short and wide. The narrow aperture has an oval shape. The arcuate columella is callous.  The color of the shell is white, with a broad chestnut band below the periphery, and tinged with chestnut at the base.

Distribution
This species occurs in the demersal zone off Queensland, Australia, and the New Hebrides.

References

  Tucker, J.K. 2004 Catalog of recent and fossil turrids (Mollusca: Gastropoda). Zootaxa 682:1–1295

External links
 Adams H. (1872). Descriptions of fourteen new species of land and marine shells. Proceedings of the Zoological Society of London. (1872): 12–15, pl. 3. page(s): 14, pl. 3 fig. 27

pupoidea
Gastropods described in 1872